Marmara University (Turkish: Marmara Üniversitesi) is a public university in Istanbul, Turkey.

The university is named after the Sea of Marmara and was founded as a university in 1982. However, it was created in 1883 under the name of Hamidiye Ticaret Mekteb-i Âlisi, in a house in the center of Istanbul. It offers courses in five languages (Turkish, English, German, French, Arabic), the only multilingual university in Turkey. The university has 13 campuses, 11 institutes, 8 colleges and 28 research centers.

Prominent alumni include Turkish President Recep Tayyip Erdogan, comic actor Kemal Sunal and media mogul Aydın Doğan.

Education

Marmara University has more than 3,000 faculty members and a student body reaching 60.000 over several campuses in the city of Istanbul. It has been one of the leading institutions of higher education in Turkey for 124 years. The university promoted itself rapidly to international stature together with the faculties of Engineering, Medicine and Dentistry where the mediums of instruction are Turkish and English. The university includes the Faculty of Economics and Administrative Sciences, which provides education in five languages: Turkish, English, French, Arabic, and German, making Marmara University the only multilingual university in Turkey. The university has been particularly successful in Medicine, Law and Fine Arts. New faculties were formed with the arrival of new students from Istanbul City University with its official closing in 2020.

The university follows the norms of enlightenment and prepares students through participatory democratic administration in accordance with the principles set by the constitution of Turkey. 2839 faculty members are employed, including 558 professors, 234 associate professors, 569 assistant professors, 237 lecturers, 987 research assistants, 172 instructors, 78 specialists, and 3 translators, 1 education planner along with 1354 administrative personnel. 500 faculty members are teaching at other universities.

Marmara University has 57,000 students, of whom 44,661 are undergraduate students and 7,406 graduate students. A total of 1,354 foreign students from 73 countries are studying at the institution. Female students constitute 54% of the total population.

Faculties

 Atatürk Faculty of Education
 Faculty of Dentistry
 Faculty of Pharmacy
 Faculty of Arts and Sciences
 Faculty of Fine Arts
 Faculty of Law
 Faculty of Economics and Administrative Sciences
 Faculty of Divinity
 Faculty of Communication
 Faculty of Engineering
 Faculty of Technical Education
 Faculty of Medicine
 Faculty of Health Education

Graduate schools

 Institute for Graduate Studies in Pure and Applied Sciences
 European Community Institute, renamed as European Union Institute in 2007
 Institute of Banking and Insurance
 Institute of Educational Sciences
 Institute of Gastroenterology Science
 Institute of Fine Arts
 Institute of Neurological Sciences
 Institute of Medical Studies
 Institute of Social Sciences
 Institute of Turcology Research
 Institute of Mid-Eastern Studies
 Institute of Health Sciences

Vocational schools

Four-year programs
 School of Banking and Insurance
 School of Physical Education and Sports
 School of Nursing
 İstanbul Zeynep Kamil Vocational School of Health Services
 School of Foreign Languages

Two-year programs
 Vocational School of Divinity
 Vocational School of Health Related Professions
 Vocational School of Social Studies
 Vocational School of Technical Studies

International profile
The university admits international students and provides education at international standards in almost all fields. Marmara University, is a modern and international university which hosts and participates in scientific meetings, cultural activities, art exhibitions and sports along with various other national and international events. Marmara University is one of the few Turkish universities which are members of the European University Association (EUA). Faculties of Engineering and Technical Education are also carrying out their international studies through ABET. The Faculty of Economics and Administrative Sciences and the Institute of Social Sciences are in the process of preparation for the quality assessment carried out by EQUIS, an international system of accreditation in management and business administration in Europe. The Institute of Social Sciences is now an institutional member of EFMD, European Foundation for Management Development. The Faculty of Law consistently participates in several international moot court competitions such as Phillip C. Jessup Moot Court Competition in the United States and Willem C. Vis Moot Court Competition in Austria. The Faculty of Law along with the Department of Political Science and International Relations represents the university in several different Model United Nations programs every year. Through the Socrates program the university has hosted 120 faculty members, and has sent 53 abroad in the last five years.

Serving students among 73 countries, the university has always been proactive in forming and extending its international relations. Most recently Marmara University acts to forge links with other European universities and also with the institutions outside the EU that will allow students and researchers to access a wide range of opportunities. Many academic units within the university have been successful in developing student/lecturer exchanges within the framework of the LLP, Erasmus/Socrates programmes offered by the European Commission. Within the Faculty of Economics and Administrative Sciences, the Department of Political Science and International Relations alone has developed Erasmus Agreements with the Centre for European Studies, Jagiellonian University, Poland; Department of Political Science, Stockholm University, Sweden; Faculty of Preservation of Cultural Heritage, University of Bologna, Italy; Faculty of Political and Social Science, University of Antwerp, Belgium; Institute for Political Science, University of Regensburg, Germany and the Institute for Political Science, Johannes Gutenberg University of Mainz, Germany; College of Social Pedagogy, Alice Salomon Vocational College Hannover, Germany. While the Faculty of Law has its links with University of Münster, Free University of Berlin, University of Bielefeld, University of Cologne from Germany, University of Athens from Greece, University of Linz from Austria, Paris Descartes University from France and University of Siena from Italy.

The International Office of Marmara University and the student-oriented ESN Marmara organisation provide support to the foreigner students among the university. Every year the students of Marmara University Management Club organize an 'International Week' to promote the social standings of the international community of Marmara University along with offering a wide-ranged cultural program to the international guest-students invited to the event.

Efficiency in Erasmus Programme
Between the 2003-2004 and 2009-2010 educational terms the university sent 1097 students abroad by Erasmus Programme. The students who admitted to program had chances to study 1-2 terms in one of the 230 partner universities of 22 European Countries. 95% of the admitted students applied to the undergraduate and graduate programs while other 5% had the chance of admitting to the foreign internship programs. Mentioned students financially supported in their time abroad by the university and European Commission. In the same time sequence Marmara University hosted 839 European students with the same programme. Due to the statistics published by the EU Education and Youth Programmes Center, Marmara University is one of the top 3 choices among the foreigner students who have applied to the exchange programs offered in Turkey.

Marmara University offers free intensive language courses(EILC) in Turkish for foreign students since 2006. By this program university had the honour of winning the European Language Label, an award offered from European Commission.

Rankings 

In 2018, Times Higher Education ranked Marmara University within the 801-1000 band globally.

Alumni

 Recep Tayyip Erdoğan, Turkish President, shall have graduated from the Faculty of Economics and Administrative Sciences in 1981, but the University was established in 1982.
 Aydın Doğan, Turkish businessman and industrialist in 1960
 Nihat Ergün, Turkish minister of Industry and Commerce since May 2009
 Kemal Sunal, Turkish actor known particularly for his role in film comedies, graduated with a master's degree from the Television Studies Department of Marmara University's Institute of Social Sciences
 Ismail Acar, Turkish artist
Betül Kaçar, Turkish astrobiologist
 Nazlı Tolga, Turkish journalist
 Nesrin Nas, Turkish academic, politician and the former leader of the Motherland Party
 Ali Kurumahmut, former Member of the Turkish Council of State
 Sevil Sabancı, member of the Sabancı family in third generation, a Turkish businesswoman
 Setenay Özbek, Turkish writer, artist and documentary maker
 Mustafa Sarıgül, former Member of the Turkish Parliament and mayor of the Istanbul district of Şişli since 1999
 Hakan Utangaç, musician
 Şebnem Paker, Turkish guitarist and singer
 Yıldo, showman, retired football player
 Edibe Sözen, Prof. Dr., academician and politician
 Bengü, musician
 Kıraç, musician
 Aysel Özakın, Turkish-British writer
 Kaan Urgancıoğlu, Turkish actor
 Hussein A Mwinyi, Zanzibar President

E-campus for students
 E-Campus of Marmara University

Campus

Marmara University has 12 campuses, with one of them serving as a hospital, widespread to the city of Istanbul.
 Göztepe Campus (Main Campus)
 Haydarpaşa Campus
 Anadolu Hisarı Campus
 Acıbadem Campus
 Nişantaşı Campus
 Bağlarbaşı Campus
 Bahçelievler Campus
 Kartal Campus
 Beyazıt Campus
 Tarabya Campus
 Marmara University Hospital
 Sultanahmet Campus

The broadcasting around campuses are listed below:
 Marmara University TV
 Radio Marmara

Sports

Sport and leisure activities are officially organized by the Directorate of Health Culture and Sports for the student body, and are offered to students and university personnel. The facilities are provided for many different kinds of sports such as basketball, volleyball, chess, table-tennis, dancing, fitness, tae-bo and mountaineering.

On the Göztepe Campus, there is a sports hall with a capacity of 850 that can be expanded to 2000. In addition to the larger hall, there are three smaller multi-purpose halls, three classrooms, a fitness center, a billiards saloon, and a dark room for the members of the Photography Club and for those who take photography courses. On the campus there are open courts for tennis, volleyball and basketball.

The students are encouraged to take part in men's and women's school teams for volleyball, basketball and soccer at the Rectorate Cup, in the tournaments for chess and table tennis and in the inter-university games.

On the Anadoluhisarı Campus where the School for Physical Education and Sports is situated, there is a multi-purpose sports hall, areas of indoor and outdoor sports activity (such as tennis, volleyball), field sports (such as football and soccer), and other sports (such as gymnastics, fitness and wrestling). There is an indoor olympic swimming pool, a mini golf course, a boathouse and an athletics track.

See also
 List of universities in Turkey

Notes

References

External links

 Marmara University Homepage (English)
 Marmara University Faculty of Engineering (English)
 E-Campus of Marmara University (Turkish)
 Marmara Üniversitesi Öğrenci Portalı(Turkish)

 
Üsküdar
1883 establishments in the Ottoman Empire
Educational institutions established in 1883